The 1999 Men's Hockey Champions Trophy was the 21st edition of the Hockey Champions Trophy men's field hockey tournament. It was the third time in the history of the annual six nations tournament that the event was combined with the Women's Champions Trophy.

Squads

Head Coach: Terry Walsh

Head Coach: Barry Dancer

Head Coach: Maurits Hendriks

Head Coach: Shahnaz Sheikh

Head Coach: Kim Sang-ryul

Head Coach: Antonio Forrellat

Results

Pool

Classification

Fifth and sixth place

Third and fourth place

Final

Awards

Final standings

References

Saqlain kashif

External links

C
C
1999
Champions Trophy (field hockey)